George Yurii Shevelov (name at birth) also known by his numerous literary pseudonyms Yurii Sherekh, Hryhory Shevchuk, Šerech, Sherekh, Sher; , , etc. (December 17, 1908 – April 12, 2002) was a Ukrainian-American professor, linguist, philologist, essayist, literary historian, and literary critic of German heritage. A longtime professor of Slavic philology at Columbia University, he challenged the prevailing notion of a unified East Slavic language from which Ukrainian, Belarusian and Russian later developed, instead proposing that these languages emerged independently from one another.

Early life

George Yurii Shevelov was born Yurii Shneider in Łomża, Poland, then part of the Russian Empire in 1908. Some sources however, indicate Kharkiv as his place of birth (his mother incorrectly stated his birthplace in order to escape persecution).  His family moved to Kharkiv in 1910. His father, Vladimir Karlovich Shnaider (Schneider) was a high ranking Russian Imperial Army officer who held the rank of major-general. His father and mother (Varvara Meder, who originally was of noble birth from an established Moscow family) were both ethnic Germans. When Russia declared war on the German Empire in 1914, his father – a fervent Russian monarchist – decided to russify the family name. Shnaider chose the Russian equivalent of his surname = Shevelov, and also changed the patronymic “Karlovich” to “Yuryevich”. Such changes required a personal petition to the Tsar, and in his case it was personally granted by Nikolai II in 1916. During the World War I, Yurii and his mother moved to Kharkiv. At the beginning of 1918, Shevelov's father was missing in action and was presumed killed.

In Kharkiv, Yurii initially attended the E. Druzhkova Private School, then at 3rd State Boy's Gymnasium, and then continued his education at the Technical School #7.

In Soviet Ukraine

In 1925 Shevelov graduated from the First Kharkiv Trade and Industry Union school . From 1925 till 1927 he worked as a statistician and archive keeper for South Chemical Trust. In 1927–1931 he attended classes at the literary-linguistic branch of the Kharkiv People's Education Institute. From August 1931 he was employed as a Ukrainian language school teacher. From 1932 till 1938 he was employed as a Ukrainian language teacher at the Ukrainian Communist Newspaper Technical School. From 1933 till 1939 he also taught Ukrainian language at the Ukrainian Communist Institute for Journalism. From September 1936 he was a postgraduate student under the guidance of Leonid Bulakhovsky.  In 1939, he taught the history of the Ukrainian language and literature. From November 1939 he became the assistant professor and deputy chair of the philology department of the Kharkiv Pedagogical Institute. In 1941 he became a research fellow at the Linguistic Institute of the Academy of Science of the Ukrainian SSR. In that same year he was pressured to become an NKVD informer.

In 1934, Shevelov was the co-author of a Grammar of the Ukrainian language in two volumes. This text was reprinted in 1935 and 1936.

During WWII

Shevelov was able to avoid induction into the Red Army and remained in Kharkiv following the Soviet evacuation, and after the Wehrmacht troops entered Kharkiv on 25 October 1941. He joined the “New Ukraine” in December 1941, a Ukrainian language newspaper partially controlled by OUN. Later Shevelov also worked at the  “Ukrainian Sowing” newspaper (}.  From April 1942 Shevelov worked for the city administration and collaborated with the educational organization Prosvita. In his memoirs, one of his former students Oles Honchar claimed that when as a Soviet POW he was detained in a Nazi Camp in Kharkiv, Shevelov refused his pleas for assistance . Shevelov answered the allegation in an interview stating that he never received the letter "...А потім у нас відбулася ще одна зустріч віч-на-віч. Гончар почав на мене нападати – ідеологічно, згадувати якісь факти, про які я нічого не знаю. Ніби-то коли в роки війни він потрапив до харківської в'язниці, то передав мені лист, в якому просив посприяти його визволенню, а я міг, та не захотів. Можливо, такий лист і справді був, але до мене він ніколи не потрапляв.". Honchar escaped death to become a renowned and influential Ukrainian writer. Shevelov has been critical of Soviet novels including Honchar's major work.

Shevelov and his mother fled the returning Red Army's advance on Kharkiv in February 1943. He resided for a brief period of time in Lviv where he continued his work in the study of Ukrainian language, including the creation of a new Ukrainian grammar until the Spring of 1944, when the Soviets continued their drive Westwards. Shevelov with the assistance of the Ukrainian Central Committee moved to Poland (Krynica) and then to Slovakia, then Austria and finally to Saxony.

In Europe

After the fall of Nazi Germany, Shevelov worked for the Ukrainian émigré newspaper “Chas” (“Time”). In 1946 he enrolled in the Ukrainian Free University in Munich and defended his doctorate dissertation in philology in 1947, continuing on his pre-war research and work "До генези називного речення" (1941) . He was also vice-president of the MUR, a Ukrainian literary association (1945–49). In order to avoid repatriation to Soviet Union from Germany, he moved to neutral Sweden, where he worked in 1950–52 as Russian language lecturer at Lund University.

In the US

In 1952, together with mother, he emigrated to the USA.  After settling in the United States he worked as a lecturer in Russian and Ukrainian at Harvard University (1952-4), associate professor (1954-8) and professor of Slavic philology at Columbia University (1958–77). He was one of the founders and president of the émigré scholarly organization “Ukrainian Free Academy of Sciences” (1959–61, 1981–86) and received an honorary doctorate from the University of Alberta (1983) and Lund University (1984).  He was a founding member of the Slovo Association of Ukrainian Writers in Exile and was published in numerous émigré bulletins and magazines.

Return to Ukraine

Shevelov was almost unknown to Ukrainian academic circles after 1943. In 1990, after an extended absence, he visited Ukraine where he was elected an international member of the National Academy of Sciences of Ukraine. In 1999 he received an honorary doctorate from the Kharkiv University and from the National University of Kyiv-Mohyla Academy.

In 2001 he published two volumes of his memoirs “Я – мене – мені…(і довкруги).”: Спогади.

He died in 2002 in New York.

Awards 
 Antonovych prize (1988)

Intellectual contributions

Shevelov prepared and published more than 600 scholarly texts concerning different aspects of the philology of the Ukrainian and other Slavic languages. From 1943 he developed the concept of the distinct establishment and development of Ukrainian and, later, Belarusian languages.  Shevelov argued against the commonly held view of an original, unified East Slavic language from which Ukrainian, Belarusian and Russian languages diverged and instead proposed the existence of several dialectical groups (Kyivan-Polissyan, Galician-Podillian, Polotsk-Smolensk, Novgorodian-Tversk, Murom-Ryazansk) that had been distinct from the beginning and which later formed into separate Ukrainian, Russian and Belarusian languages. According to Shevelov, the beginnings of a separate Ukrainian language could be traced to the 7th century while the language formed in approximately the 16th century

Heritage and legacy
On 4 September 2013 memorial plaque to Shevelov in his native Kharkiv was unveiled. On 25 September 2013 the city council of Kharkiv, after an appeal by the Anti-Fascist Committee of Kharkiv, voted with 65 deputies for and four against (all four members of Batkivshchyna) that the memorial plaque to Shevelov in Kharkiv was placed there illegally. According to Mayor Hennadiy Kernes Shevelov "proved to be a Nazi henchman". Kharkiv Oblast Governor Mykhailo Dobkin suggested that Shevelov during World War II "took an apartment of a Jewish family which, most likely, was shot". In an open letter addressed the Kharkiv city council scientists from the University of Cambridge, Columbia University, the University of Kansas, Rutgers University, Northwestern University and the University of Alberta had pleaded that the allegations that Shevelov was a Nazi collaborator "were thoroughly investigated by numerous US government agencies and Columbia University who completely and unequivocally rejected these acquisitions". Half an hour after the Kharkiv city council had established that the memorial plaque to Shevelov was illegal (citizens who identified themselves as) public employees destroyed the memorial plaque. On 5 January 2015 the Kharkiv Administrative Court of Appeal reversed the decision of the Kharkiv city council to dismantle the memorial plaque for Shevelov. In 2021 the memorial plaque was reinstated after a public fundraiser.

Select bibliography

"Головні правила українського правопису" (Neu-Ulm, 1946),
"До генези називного речення" (Munich, 1947),
"Галичина в формуванні нової української літературної мови" (Munich, 1949),
"Сучасна українська літературна мова" (Munich, 1949),
"Нарис сучасної української літературної мови" (Munich, 1951),
"Всеволод Ганцов – Олена Курило" (Winnipeg, 1954),
"A Reader in the Hіstory of the Eastern Slavіc" (New-York 1958, співав.),
"The Syntax of Modern Lіterary Ukrainian" (1963),
"Не для дітей. Літературно-критичні статті і есеї" (New-York, 1964),
"A Prehіstory of Slavіc: The Historical Phonology of Common Slavіc" (1964, Heidelberg; 1965, New-York),
"Die ukrainіsche Schrіftsprache 1798–1965" (Wiesbaden, 1966),
"Teasers and Appeasers" (1971),
"Друга черга: Література. Театр. Ідеології" (1978),
"A Historical Phonology of the Ukrainian Language" (1979» «Історична фонологія української мови», перекл. укр., 2002),
"Українська мова в першій половині двадцятого століття(1900–1941): Стан і статус" (1987) and many other.
  «Історична фонологія української мови». пер. Сергія Вакуленка та Андрія Даниленка. Харків: Акта, 2002.

Notes

Book references
 Шевельов (Шерех), Ю.В. “Я – мене – мені…(і довкруги).”: Спогади. – Х.; Нью-Йорк: Вид-во М.П.Коць, 2001. – Т.1.
Боґуміла Бердиховська. Україна: люди і книжки / Переклад з польської Тетяна Довжок. КІС, 2009. p 167-178
А. В. Скоробогатов Харків у часи німецької окупації (1941—1943). — Харків: Прапор, 2006.  —

External links
 GEORGE Y. SHEVELOV Homer's Arbitration in a Ukrainian Linguistic Controversy: Alexander Potebnja and Peter Niscyns'kyj
 Rieger J., Hnatiuk A. Jurij Szewelow (George Y. Shevelov, Jurij Szerech)1908–2002 // Slavia Orientalis. – 2002. – T. LI. – Nr. 3. – S. 351–360 
George Y. Shevelov biography and bibliography at Kharkiv University
George Y. Shevelov biography and bibliography at Kharkiv University
 George Y. Shevelov Papers at the Rare Book and Manuscript Library, Columbia University, New York, NY

1908 births
2002 deaths
People from Kharkov Governorate
Ukrainian people of German descent
Slavists
Ukrainianists
Linguists from Ukraine
Ukrainian literary critics
Ukrainian democracy activists
Ukrainian studies
National University of Kharkiv alumni
Harvard University faculty
Columbia University faculty
Academic staff of the National University of Kharkiv
Chevaliers of the Order of Merit (Ukraine)
Recipients of the Shevchenko National Prize
Members of the National Academy of Sciences of Ukraine
Members of the Shevchenko Scientific Society
20th-century linguists